Peter Harvey (1944–2013) was an Australian journalist and broadcaster.

Peter Harvey may also refer to:

 Peter Harvey (writer) (1798–1877), American merchant and author
 Peter Harvey (cricketer, born 1926) (1926–1966), English cricketer
 Peter Harvey (cricketer, born 1923) (1923–2006), English cricketer
 Peter Harvey (baritone) (born 1958), English baritone
 Peter C. Harvey, first African American to serve as New Jersey Attorney General
 Peter Harvey (academic) (born 1951), writer and academic scholar on Buddhism